The 2019 season was Remo's 105th existence. The club participated in the Campeonato Brasileiro Série C, the Campeonato Paraense, the Copa Verde and the Copa do Brasil.

Remo finished outside of the top four of the Campeonato Brasileiro Série C (5th place in the group stage and 9th overall), but they won the Campeonato Paraense by the 46th time. In the Copa Verde, the club was eliminated in the semi-finals by Paysandu 3-1 in the aggregate. In the Copa do Brasil, Remo ended in the first round by Serra.

Players

Squad information
Numbers in parentheses denote appearances as substitute.

Top scorers

Disciplinary record

Kit
Supplier: Topper / Main sponsor: VeganNation

Transfers

Transfers in

Transfers out

Notes

Competitions

Campeonato Brasileiro Série C

Group stage

Matches

Campeonato Paraense

Group stage

Matches

Final stage

Semi-finals

Finals

Copa Verde

Round of 16

Quarter-finals

Semi-finals

Copa do Brasil

First round

References

External links
Official Site 
Remo 100% 

2019 season
Clube do Remo seasons
Brazilian football clubs 2019 season